Halina Krzyżanowska (1860, Paris–1937, Rennes) was an internationally renowned Polish-French pianist and composer.

Life

She was born in Paris, in a large musical family, which originally came from Poland and was a part of the impoverished Polish nobility. Halina (also Helene) held by birth the title of a countess (Gräfin in Germany, hrabina in Poland). She was (by her fathers family) also a distant relative of Chopin, whom she never personally knew, as he died at such an early age.

She studied at the Conservatoire de Paris with Antoine François Marmontel and Ernest Guiraud, and in 1880 she won the first prize at this prominent Conservatory.

She gave many concerts in various European countries and settled later in France as a professor at the conservatory in Rennes.

She was known as a very talented pianist and has made a name for herself also as a composer.

Works
Krzyżanowska composed orchestral and chamber music, piano sonatas and character pieces for piano. Selected works include:
Magdusia (1894) 1-act opera
Fantasie piano concerto
Sonata for cello and piano

References

1860 births
1937 deaths
19th-century classical composers
20th-century classical composers
Polish composers
Women classical composers
20th-century women composers
19th-century women composers
Polish women composers